Slobodan Živojinović was the defending champion but lost in the quarterfinals to Lars-Anders Wahlgren.

Ivan Lendl won in the final 6–2, 6–2, 6–1 against Wahlgren.

Seeds

  Ivan Lendl (champion)
  Jakob Hlasek (first round)
  Carl-Uwe Steeb (second round)
  John Fitzgerald (first round)
  Slobodan Živojinović (quarterfinals)
  Eric Jelen (first round)
  Richard Matuszewski (first round)
  Wally Masur (second round)

Draw

Finals

Top half

Bottom half

References
 1989 Australian Indoor Championships draw

1989 Grand Prix (tennis)
1989 Singles